Dr. Jeremiah and Ann Jane DePew House is a historic home located at Danville, Hendricks County, Indiana.  It was built in 1858, and is a two-story, five bay, I-house with a one-story rear ell and Greek Revival style design elements.  A full width American Craftsman style front porch was added after 1936.

It was added to the National Register of Historic Places in 2006.

References

Houses on the National Register of Historic Places in Indiana
Greek Revival houses in Indiana
Houses completed in 1858
National Register of Historic Places in Hendricks County, Indiana
Buildings and structures in Hendricks County, Indiana